Andrew Gottlieb is an American producer and a comedy writer.

Career
He has written sitcoms (The Single Guy, Watching Ellie), feature films (Agent Fabulous), daytime serial (ABC Daytime's Loving), and books (In The Paint, Death to All Sacred Cows, Drink Play F@#k).

He was an Executive Producer of Z Rock.

His book Drink, Play, F@#k: One Man's Search for Anything Across Ireland, Las Vegas, and Thailand is a parody on a memoir Eat, Pray, Love by Elizabeth Gilbert.

External links 
The New Yorker, The Book Bench

Living people
American soap opera writers
Year of birth missing (living people)